Cthulhu Live is a live-action roleplaying game (LARP) version of the popular horror roleplaying game Call of Cthulhu, based on the works of horror author H. P. Lovecraft.

Publication history
Created by game designer Robert "Mac" McLaughlin, the first edition of the game was published in 1997 by Chaosium as a 154-page softcover book, with cover art by Bob Berta.

A second edition and four supplements were published over the following years by Fantasy Flight Games. 

In 2006, a third edition was published by Skirmisher Publishing LLC.

Setting
Like Call of Cthulhu, this game is set in the 1920s. Players take on the role of ordinary folk (lawyers, private eyes, etc.) who are drawn into investigating the rise of occult horrors in their neighbourhood.

Gameplay
Rules have been deliberately streamlined to accommodate the live-action aspect. Character have only four attributes: Dexterity, Education, Constitution, and Power, as well as a number of Sanity Points that represent mental stability. The player can then buy a number of skills from a list.

When a character wants to try a task, the referee assigns the task a difficulty, and then compares the difficulty to the character's relevant skill. If the skill equals or exceeds the difficulty of the task, then the character succeeds.

Reception
In the November 1997 edition of Dragon (Issue 241), Rick Swan "adored" the game, although he admitted it had a few problems. Swan believed the live-action game needed 10-15 participants, far more than a normal role-playing game. And he found the combat system "awkward". Nonetheless he gave the game a thumbs up, saying, "You'll find Cthulhu Live to be a great way to spend a weekend, a theatrical extravaganza that captures the flavor of the RPG and doesn’t take itself too seriously."

Reviews
Shadis #34 (1996)
Arcane #18
Backstab (Issue 3 - May/Jun 1997)

References

External links
Official Cthulhu Live website
Robert McLaughlin Interview Flames Rising

Call of Cthulhu (role-playing game)
Cthulhu Mythos role-playing games
Live-action role-playing games
Role-playing games introduced in 1997
Horror role-playing games